Korethrasteridae is a family of starfish in the order Velatida. It contains the following genera and species:

 Genus Korethraster
 Korethraster hispidus
 Genus Peribolaster
 Peribolaster biserialis
 Peribolaster folliculatus
 Peribolaster lictor
 Peribolaster macleani
 Genus Remaster
 Remaster gourdoni
 Remaster palmatus

References 

Velatida
Echinoderm families